Robert Andrew Baxter (October 16, 1879 – 1947) was a farmer and political figure in Ontario. He represented Oxford South in the Legislative Assembly of Ontario from 1929 to 1934 as a Liberal.

He was born in Brownsville, the son of John Baxter and Sarah Bigham, and was educated in Brownsville and Tillsonburg. In 1916, he married Frances H Overbaugh (née Louch). Baxter served as reeve for Durham township and as warden for Oxford County. He died in 1947.

References

External links

1879 births
1947 deaths
Ontario Liberal Party MPPs